Rail or rails may refer to:

Rail transport
Rail transport and related matters
Rail (rail transport) or railway lines, the running surface of a railway

Arts and media

Film 
Rails (film), a 1929 Italian film by Mario Camerini
Rail (1967 film), a film by Geoffrey Jones for British Transport Films
Mirattu or Rail, a Tamil-language film and its Telugu dub

Magazines
Rail (magazine), a British rail transport periodical
Rails (magazine), a former New Zealand based rail transport periodical

Other arts
The Rails, a British folk-rock band
Rail (theater) or batten, a pipe from which lighting, scenery, or curtains are hung

Technology
Rails framework or Ruby on Rails, a web application framework
Rail system (firearms), a mounting system for firearm attachments
Front engine dragster
Runway alignment indicator lights, a configuration of an approach lighting system
Rule Augmented Interconnect Layout, a specification for expressing guidelines for printed circuit boards; companion to the Input/output Buffer Information Specification

Other uses
Rail (bird), a family of birds
Rail (name)
Rail, Missouri, a ghost town in the United States 
Rail drink, an alcoholic beverage ordered with house liquors
Rural Appalachian Improvement League, an American non-profit organisation
Rail, a line of cocaine

See also
Curtain rail, a rail from which curtains are hung
Door rails, a horizontal outside member on a door or in a frame and panel construction
Guard rail, for protective separation
Hand rail, for physical support, such as on stairways and steps
Picatinny rail, a bracket used on some firearms as a mounting platform
Power supply rail or voltage rail, a single voltage provided by a power supply unit
Rail profile, the cross sectional shape of a railway rail
Railing (disambiguation)
Railway (disambiguation)
Railways (disambiguation)
Rayl (disambiguation)
Riding a rail or being run out of town on a rail
Third rail, a method of providing electric power to a railway train